Vivian Nichole Nixon (born May 31, 1984) is an American actress and dancer. She played Dr. Hannah Brody in the medical drama series Grey's Anatomy and voices Millie in the adult animated web series Helluva Boss.

Early life
Born in Miami, Florida, she is one of three children of former NBA star Norm Nixon and actress Debbie Allen. She was named after her grandmother Vivian Ayers-Allen. Her aunt is actress Phylicia Rashad and her younger brother is basketball player Norm E. Nixon Jr. Vivian took gymnastics until she was 13, but when a fellow gymnast fell and was seriously injured, her mother took her out of the sport. She went on to study at the Kirov Academy of Ballet in Washington, D.C. and at the Debbie Allen Dance Academy.

Career
On her final year of the Ailey/Fordham BFA Program in Dance, Nixon was cast as Kalimba in the Broadway production of Hot Feet, the classic storyline of The Red Shoes with a '70s funk facelift, and Kalimba is the ambitious girl at the center of it who can't stop dancing (literally). She was named of the top "25 to Watch" by Dance Magazine in 2007. Her regional credits, including Alan Johnson's West Side Story  (Anita), Bayou Legend (Sara), Pearl (Pearl), Soul Possessed, Dreams, Brothers of the Knight and The Hot Chocolate Nutcracker. She performed on the European tour of West Side Story and Harriet. Nixon has appeared in films 500 Days of Summer and Top Five. On television, she had secondary roles in the Fox musical series Glee and NBC's Smash. In 2015, she began appearing as Dr. Hannah Brody in the ABC medical drama series, Grey's Anatomy. In 2020, she appeared in its spin-off series, Station 19. In December 2020, she began voicing Millie in the web series Helluva Boss in all episodes, except the pilot. Nixon is associate director at Debbie Allen Dance Academy.

Personal life
Nixon has one daughter, Shiloh Elizabeth Williams, born on February 7, 2019.

Filmography

Film

Television

Web series

References

External links
 
Interview with Vivian Nixon regarding her role in Hot Feet

American female dancers
American dancers
1984 births
Living people
Actresses from Miami
21st-century American actresses
African-American female dancers
African-American actresses
African-American choreographers
American choreographers
American stage actresses
American television actresses
21st-century African-American women
21st-century African-American people
20th-century African-American people
20th-century African-American women